Pelican Point is a coastal town in South Australia that surrounds a headland on the continental coastline. It  consists mostly of holiday shacks. The north side of the point faces Bungaloo Bay. The point was previously known as Pointe des Cordonniers. The current boundaries were created on 31 October 1996 including both the Bungaloo Bay and Pelican Point shack areas.

The 2016 Australian census which was conducted in August 2016 reports that Pelican Point and some adjoining land in the locality of Carpenter Rocks had a population of 84 people.

Pelican Point is located within the federal Division of Barker, the state electoral district of Mount Gambier and the local government area of the District Council of Grant.

See also
Pelican Point (disambiguation)

References
Notes

Citations

Limestone Coast